Benoit  is a town in Bolivar County, Mississippi, United States. Per the 2020 Census, the population was 365.

History
The 1956 movie Baby Doll was shot on location at the Burrus House in Benoit; many local residents played in minor roles.

Geography
Benoit is located at  (33.650500, -91.008560).

Demographics

2020 census

Note: the US Census treats Hispanic/Latino as an ethnic category. This table excludes Latinos from the racial categories and assigns them to a separate category. Hispanics/Latinos can be of any race.

2000 Census
As of the census of 2000, there were 611 people, 193 households, and 153 families residing in the town. The population density was 627.2 people per square mile (243.2/km2). There were 211 housing units at an average density of 216.6 per square mile (84.0/km2). The racial makeup of the town was 21.28% White, 76.27% African American, 0.98% from other races, and 1.47% from two or more races. Hispanic or Latino of any race were 2.29% of the population.

There were 193 households, out of which 38.3% had children under the age of 18 living with them, 30.6% were married couples living together, 42.5% had a female householder with no husband present, and 20.7% were non-families. 19.7% of all households were made up of individuals, and 10.4% had someone living alone who was 65 years of age or older. The average household size was 3.17 and the average family size was 3.57.

In the town, the population was spread out, with 37.0% under the age of 18, 10.8% from 18 to 24, 24.2% from 25 to 44, 17.5% from 45 to 64, and 10.5% who were 65 years of age or older. The median age was 26 years. For every 100 females, there were 85.7 males. For every 100 females age 18 and over, there were 68.9 males.

The median income for a household in the town was $18,750, and the median income for a family was $18,929. Males had a median income of $30,357 versus $20,750 for females. The per capita income for the town was $7,813. About 43.1% of families and 49.3% of the population were below the poverty line, including 64.0% of those under age 18 and 18.2% of those age 65 or over.

Education
Benoit is served by the West Bolivar Consolidated School District.

Formerly the area had its own school, Ray Brooks School (formerly Nugent Center School), a K-12 school. It was at first a part of the Benoit School District, until July 1, 2014, when that district was consolidated into West Bolivar Consolidated. In 1986 students were moved to West Bolivar High School for high school classes, but they were moved back to Ray Brooks in 2000. Ray Brooks closed in 2020. Tamara Lopez of Delta News TV stated "Residents in Benoit had mixed reactions to the announcement, some angry others sad."

Notable people
 Lavarus Lakeith Giles, professional American and Canadian football running back
 Archie Moore, light heavyweight world champion boxer (1952–1962)
 Robert Powell, composer, organist, and choir director
 Eddie Taylor, electric blues guitarist and singer

References

Towns in Bolivar County, Mississippi
Towns in Mississippi